Batuta may refer to:
Bătuța, a village in Bârzava, Arad, Romania
Ibn Batuta,  (1304 – 1368 or 1369), Muslim Moroccan scholar and explorer
Silva Batuta (born 1940), Brazilian footballer
Henryk Batuta, a fictional person from a hoax perpetrated on the Polish Wikipedia
Fundación Nacional Batuta, Colombian music-education system

See also
Ibn Battuta (disambiguation)